Torcy-le-Grand may refer to the following places in France:

 Torcy-le-Grand, Aube, a commune in the Aube department
 Torcy-le-Grand, Seine-Maritime, a commune in the Seine-Maritime department